The Charles H. Burwell House is a historic house museum in Minnetonka, Minnesota, United States, built in 1883.  Charles H. Burwell (1838–1917) was the secretary and manager of the Minnetonka Mills Company, the first mill west of Minneapolis, around which grew the first permanent Euro-American settlement in Hennepin County west of Minneapolis.  This property on Minnehaha Creek, including the house and two outbuildings, is listed on the National Register of Historic Places for its Carpenter Gothic/Stick style architecture and association with Minnetonka's early milling history.

History
Charles H. Burwell was born in New Haven, Connecticut, in 1838.  He moved to Minnesota in 1874 after his first wife died.  He married Mary Carey Durham in 1876, and the family took up residence in the Minnetonka Hotel until his house was built in 1883.  Burwell took pride in his house, as shown by the number of photos he took and in the lack of exterior modifications through the years.

The Minnetonka Mills Company had a short but productive milling career.  It produced 300 barrels of flour per day in 1881, but as milling companies in Minneapolis became more powerful, Minnetonka Mills was unable to compete, and it closed down in 1886.  Burwell then commuted to Minneapolis where he served as a secretary to businessman and legislator Loren Fletcher.  When he died in 1917, Burwell had considerable influence in the community.

Current use
The house is now operated by the Minnetonka Historical Society, with guided tours offered during the summer and around Christmas.

See also
 National Register of Historic Places listings in Hennepin County, Minnesota

References

External links
Minnetonka Historical Society

1883 establishments in Minnesota
Historic house museums in Minnesota
Houses completed in 1883
Houses in Hennepin County, Minnesota
Houses on the National Register of Historic Places in Minnesota
Museums in Hennepin County, Minnesota
National Register of Historic Places in Hennepin County, Minnesota
Stick-Eastlake architecture in the United States